Anas Bakhat (born 2 April 2000) is a German professional footballer who plays as a midfielder for 1. FC Düren.

Club career
On 20 January 2023, Bakhat's contract with 1. FC Kaiserslautern was terminated by mutual consent.

References

External links
 

2000 births
21st-century German people
Living people
German footballers
Sportspeople from Mainz
Footballers from Rhineland-Palatinate
Association football midfielders
1. FC Kaiserslautern II players
1. FC Kaiserslautern players
3. Liga players
Oberliga (football) players